Wienerwald may refer to:
The Vienna Woods, forested highlands in the Northern Limestone Alps
Wienerwald (restaurant), a chain of fast-food restaurants
Wienerwald, Austria, a town in Bezirk Mödling, Lower Austria, Austria

See also
 "Tales from the Vienna Woods" (German: "Geschichten aus dem Wienerwald"), a waltz by Johann Strauss II